The Albanian Basketball Cup (Women) is a competition featuring female professional basketball clubs from Albania and the second important event after Albanian Basketball League. It was founded in 1956 from the Albanian Basketball Association. The team with the most trophies is Tirana with 26 cups won.

Winners

Performance by club
PBC Tirana 26 times

PBC Flamurtari 20 times

Skënderbeu Korçë 6 times

B.C Apolonia 4 times

Luftëtari 2 times

Vllaznia Shkodër 2 times

KS Elbasani 2 times

BC Teuta Durrës (Women) 1 time

Tirana Barleti Basket 1 time

WBC Partizani 1 time

References

External links

Women's basketball competitions in Albania
Women's basketball cup competitions in Europe
Women
1956 establishments in Albania
Recurring sporting events established in 1956